Novopokrovka is a village in the Ysyk-Ata District of Chüy Region of Kyrgyzstan. Divided over two rural communities, its total population was 21,619 in 2021.

Population

References

Populated places in Chüy Region